Lisa Howard  may refer to:
 Lisa Howard (American actress, born 1975), American actress and singer
 Lisa Howard (reporter) (1926–1965), American actress and journalist
 Lisa Howard (Canadian actress) (born 1963), Canadian actress